Oakland is a borough in Susquehanna County, Pennsylvania, United States. The population of Oakland borough was 564 at the 2020 census.

History
Oakland Borough was formed from part of Oakland Township on November 14, 1883.  It was originally known as North or West Susquehanna, then Oakland village.

Novelist, essayist, literary critic, and university professor John Gardner, author of Grendel, The Art of Fiction, On Becoming a Novelist etc., died in a motorcycle accident here.

Geography
Oakland is located at  (41.949506, -75.608428).

Demographics

As of the census of 2010, there were 616 people, 229 households, and 163 families residing in the borough. The population density was 1,368.9 people per square mile (528.5/km2). There were 256 housing units at an average density of 568.9/sq mi (222.2/km2). The racial makeup of the borough was 98.4% White, 0.5% African American, 0.6% Asian, and 0.5% from two or more races. Hispanic or Latino of any race were 1.3% of the population.

There were 229 households, out of which 28.8% had children under the age of 18 living with them, 46.7% were married couples living together, 14.4% had a female householder with no husband present, and 28.8% were non-families. 21.4% of all households were made up of individuals, and 7% had someone living alone who was 65 years of age or older. The average household size was 2.69 and the average family size was 3.05.

In the borough the population was spread out, with 24.7% under the age of 18, 63.8% from 18 to 64, and 11.5% who were 65 years of age or older. The median age was 38.7 years.

The median income for a household in the borough was $36,750, and the median income for a family was $40,179. Males had a median income of $28,684 versus $19,643 for females. The per capita income for the borough was $16,352. About 10.6% of families and 11.7% of the population were below the poverty line, including 9% of those under age 18 and 12.3% of those age 65 or over.

References

Boroughs in Susquehanna County, Pennsylvania
Populated places established in 1884
1884 establishments in Pennsylvania